The 2011–12 National Premier League (also known as the 2011–12 Red Stripe Premier League) is the highest competitive football league in Jamaica. It is the 38th edition of the competition. The season will begin in August 2011 and will be completed in May 2012.  The teams will play each other 3 times each then the final 5 games will be played amongst the top 6 and bottom 6; making it a total of 38 games each. Tivoli Gardens were the defending champions, having won their fifth Jamaican championship last season.

Teams 
St. George's and Benfica finished 11th and 12th at the end of last season and both were relegated to the Eastern Confederation Super League.

Taking their places in the league this season are Highgate United, champions of the Eastern Confederation Super League, and Montego Bay United, champions of the Western Confederation Super League, which were the best two clubs in last season's second level promotion playoffs.

League table

Results

Matches 1–22

Matches 23–33

Matches 34–38

Top six

Bottom six

Top goalscorers 

Updated to games played on 27 April 2012
Source: plcajamaica

Promotion from Super Leagues
The winners of the 4 regional Super Leagues play-off in a home and home round robin series.
KSAFA Super League - Cavaliers
South Central Confederation Super League - New Green Community
Eastern Confederation Super League - Volvo United FC
Western Confederation Super League - Savannah FC

Results

References

External links 
 Official Site

National Premier League seasons
1
Jam